Philotoceraeoides is a genus of beetles in the family Cerambycidae, containing the following species:

 Philotoceraeoides albulus Breuning, 1957
 Philotoceraeoides multilineatus Breuning, 1957

References

Agapanthiini